Sunset Corners is a community in Vaughan, Ontario located at Ontario Highway 50 and Queen Street (Highway 7).

A small pocket of un-developed land south of Highway 7, but surrounded by industrial/business parks. Costco has built a large store on Highway 7 east of Highway 50. The extension of Highway 427 will likely attract further growth of the area.

Neighbourhoods in Vaughan